Holland Village (or Holland V) can refer to

Places
Holland Village, Singapore
Holland Village in Gaoqiao, Shanghai, People's Republic of China
Holland Village in Shenyang, People's Republic of China, a development project of businessman Yang Bin

Transportation
Holland Village MRT station on the Circle MRT line in Singapore's Mass Rapid Transit

Arts and Entertainment
Holland V (TV series), a Singapore Chinese drama serial